Armindo Cadilla Ginorio (1906–1975), served as an associate justice of the Puerto Rico Supreme Court from 1973 to 1975.

Born in Arecibo, Puerto Rico on January 11, 1906, he studied law at the University of Puerto Rico School of Law.

In 1963, he was appointed by Governor Luis Muñoz Marín as a Superior Court Justice.  In 1973, at the age of 67, he was appointed by Governor Rafael Hernández Colón as an Associate Justice.  After 10 years serving on the bench in Ponce, he won the admiration of former Associate Justice and Ponce native Rafael Hernández Matos, as well as his son Rafael, elected Governor in 1972.

Cadilla Ginorio's service on the Supreme Court was short-lived, since he died in Río Piedras, Puerto Rico at the age of 69 on February 16, 1975, two years and two days after having joined the Court. He was buried at Cementerio Municipal de Arecibo (Viejo) in Arecibo, Puerto Rico.

Sources 

La Justicia en sus Manos by Luis Rafael Rivera, 

1906 births
1975 deaths
Associate Justices of the Supreme Court of Puerto Rico
20th-century American lawyers
People from Arecibo, Puerto Rico
Puerto Rican lawyers
20th-century American judges